is the second studio album by Japan-based American heavy metal band Animetal USA, formed as a tribute to Eizo Sakamoto's band Animetal. Released through SME Records on June 6, 2012, the album consists of a series of English language covers of popular anime theme songs. Unlike the previous album, Animetal USA sought out the input from their Japanese and American fans for suggestions on tracks to include on their second album and it also includes an original track. "Give Lee Give Lee Rock Lee" is a collaboration with Hironobu Kageyama of LAZY and JAM Project. A limited edition release includes a bonus DVD

The album peaked at No. 17 on Oricon's weekly albums chart, remaining there for eight weeks.

Track listing 
All tracks are arranged by Chris Impellitteri and Marty Friedman.

Personnel 
 Michael Vescera (a.k.a. "Metal Rider") - lead vocals
 Chris Impellitteri (a.k.a. "Speed King") - guitar
 Rudy Sarzo (a.k.a. "Storm Bringer") - bass
 Jon Dette (a.k.a. "Tank") - drums

with

 Hironobu Kageyama - vocals (11)

Charts

Footnotes

References

External links 
 
 
 

2012 albums
Animetal USA albums
Albums produced by Greg Reely
Covers albums
Sony Music Entertainment Japan albums